Simona Halep was the defending champion, but chose not to participate.

Barbora Krejčíková won the title, defeating Tereza Martincová in the final, 6–2, 6–0.

Seeds

Draw

Finals

Top half

Bottom half

Qualifying

Seeds

Qualifiers

Lucky losers

Draw

First qualifier

Second qualifier

Third qualifier

Fourth qualifier

Fifth qualifier

Sixth qualifier

References

Main Draw
Qualifying Draw

Prague Open - Singles
2021 Singles